The 2014 Indonesian Masters Grand Prix Gold (officially known as the Yonex Sunrise Indonesian Masters 2014 for sponsorship reasons) was the thirteenth grand prix gold and grand prix tournament of the 2014 BWF Grand Prix Gold and Grand Prix. The tournament was held in Jakabaring Sport City, Palembang, Indonesia from 9–14 September 2014 and had a total purse of $120,000.

Players by nation

Men's singles

Seeds

  Dionysius Hayom Rumbaka (third round)
  Sony Dwi Kuncoro (third round)
  Derek Wong (third round)
  Anand Pawar (third round)
  H. S. Prannoy (champion)
  Sai Praneeth Bhamidipati (quarter-final)
  Mohd Arif Abdul Latif (second round)
  Andre Kurniawan Tedjono (third round)
  Daren Liew (semi-final)
  Tam Chun Hei (second round)
  Zulfadli Zulkiffli (semi-final)
  Wisnu Yuli Prasetyo (withdrew)
  Chan Kwong Beng (withdrew)
  Ajay Jayaram (third round)
  Riyanto Subagja (quarter-final)
  Evert Sukamta (third round)

Finals

Top half

Section 1

Section 2

Section 3

Section 4

Bottom half

Section 5

Section 6

Section 7

Section 8

Women's singles

Seeds

  Tee Jing Yi (withdrew)
  Maria Febe Kusumastuti (semi-final)
  Adriyanti Firdasari (champion)
  Chen Jiayuan (quarter-final)
  Aprilia Yuswandari (quarter-final)
  Olga Golovanova (first round)
  Yang Li Lian (withdrew)
  Iris Wang (second round)

Finals

Top half

Section 1

Section 2

Bottom half

Section 3

Section 4

Men's doubles

Seeds

  Marcus Fernaldi Gideon / Markis Kido (champion)
  Berry Angriawan / Ricky Karanda Suwardi (quarter-final)
  Wahyu Nayaka / Ade Yusuf (semi-final)
  Nikita Khakimov / Vasily Kuznetsov (second round)
  Selvanus Geh / Kevin Sanjaya Sukamuljo (final)
  Andrei Adistia / Hendra Aprida Gunawan (first round)
  Ronald Alexander / Edi Subaktiar (second round)
  Huang Po-jui / Lu Ching-yao (semi-final)

Finals

Top half

Section 1

Section 2

Bottom half

Section 3

Section 4

Women's doubles

Seeds

  Jongkonphan Kittiharakul / Rawinda Prajongjai (semi-final)
  Olga Golovanova / Viktoriia Vorobeva (quarter-final)
  Shendy Puspa Irawati / Vita Marissa (champion)
  Keshya Nurvita Hanadia / Devi Tika Permatasari (final)

Finals

Top half

Section 1

Section 2

Bottom half

Section 3

Section 4

Mixed doubles

Seeds

  Riky Widianto / Richi Puspita Dili (champion)
  Muhammad Rijal / Vita Marissa (final)
  Irfan Fadhilah / Weni Anggraini (second round)
  Edi Subaktiar / Gloria Emanuelle Widjaja (semi-final)

Finals

Top half

Section 1

Section 2

Bottom half

Section 3

Section 4

References

Indonesian Masters (badminton)
Indonesia
2014 in Indonesian sport
Sport in Palembang
Indonesia Masters Grand Prix Gold
Indonesia Masters Grand Prix Gold